Augustín Paulík (born 17 July 1982) is a Slovak football midfielder who played for FK Inter Bratislava and currently plays for OŠK Chynorany.

He played with FC Koper in the Slovenian First League.

References

1981 births
Living people
Slovak footballers
Association football midfielders
FK Inter Bratislava players
MFK Topvar Topoľčany players
FK Žiar nad Hronom players
FK Spartak Bánovce nad Bebravou players
FC Koper players
TJ Baník Ružiná players
Slovak Super Liga players
3. Liga (Slovakia) players
Expatriate footballers in Slovenia